is a Japanese footballer currently playing as a midfielder for Tiamo Hirakata.

Career statistics

Club
.

Notes

References

External links

2003 births
Living people
People from Matsumoto, Nagano
Association football people from Nagano Prefecture
Japanese footballers
Japan youth international footballers
Association football midfielders
J1 League players
Japan Football League players
Shonan Bellmare players
FC Tiamo Hirakata players